Crazy Watto is a two-minute-long fan film that made its debut on the Internet in 2000. The film is a spoof of used car deal ads shown on television, featuring Watto from Star Wars: Episode I – The Phantom Menace. Watto offers up for sale familiar ships (and objects) such as an X-wing with "genuine battle marks used in the Battle of Yavin" for $599.99 and an AT-AT for $999.99. Fans of other sci-fi shows notice that he auctions a Borg cube for $899.99, and also puts up ships from Star Trek and Captain Power and the Soldiers of the Future for $29.99 each.

The film played at the 2005 Cannes Film Festival, and is a popular fan film at many science fiction conventions. The film was originally hosted by TheForce.Net, but is now part of The Official Star Wars Fan Film Awards on AtomFilms.

References

External links
 
 Crazy Watto at Z-Team Productions
 Crazy Watto at Atomfilms 

2000 independent films
2000 films
Fan films based on Star Wars
2000s English-language films
2000s American films